The 2002 San Francisco Giants season was the 120th in franchise history, the franchise's 45th season in San Francisco, and their third in Pacific Bell Park. The season ended with the Giants winning the National League pennant but losing to the Anaheim Angels in the 2002 World Series.

The Giants finished the regular season with a record of 95–66,  games behind the Arizona Diamondbacks in the National League West standings. By virtue of having the best record among second-place teams in the National League, they won the NL wild card to earn a postseason berth.

In the postseason, the Giants faced the Atlanta Braves in the National League Division Series. After being brought to the brink of elimination, the Giants won Games 4 and 5 to clinch the series, three games to two. They went on to defeat the St. Louis Cardinals in the National League Championship Series, four games to one to win the franchise's 17th NL championship and its third in San Francisco. Then, in the World Series, they brought the Angels to the brink of elimination before the Angels came from behind to win Games 6 and 7.

2002 was manager Dusty Baker's tenth and final season managing the Giants. Following the season he departed to manage the Chicago Cubs.

Offseason
November 28, 2001: Wayne Gomes was released by the San Francisco Giants.
December 16, 2001: Tsuyoshi Shinjo was traded by the New York Mets with Desi Relaford to the San Francisco Giants for Shawn Estes.
December 18, 2001: Jason Schmidt was signed as a free agent with the San Francisco Giants.
January 25, 2002: David Bell was traded by the Seattle Mariners to the San Francisco Giants for Desi Relaford and cash.

Regular season

Opening Day starters
SP- Jason Schmidt
C-  Benito Santiago
1B – J. T. Snow
2B – Jeff Kent
SS – Rich Aurilia
3B – Pedro Feliz
LF – Barry Bonds
CF – Tsuyoshi Shinjo
RF – Reggie Sanders

Season standings

National League West

Record vs. opponents

Transactions
 June 4, 2002: Matt Cain was drafted by the San Francisco Giants in the 1st round (25th pick) of the 2002 amateur draft. Player signed June 26, 2002.
 July 28, 2002: Kenny Lofton was traded by the Chicago White Sox to the San Francisco Giants for Felix Diaz and Ryan Meaux (minors).
September 4, 2002: Bill Mueller was traded by the Chicago Cubs with cash to the San Francisco Giants for Jeff Verplancke (minors).

Game log and schedule

|- style="background-color:#bfb;"
| 1 || April 2 || @ Dodgers || 9–2 || Hernández (1–0) || Brown (0-1) || –|| Dodger Stadium || 53,356 || 1–0 || W1
|- style="background-color:#bfb;"
| 2 || April 3 || @ Dodgers || 12–0 || Ortiz (1–0) || Nomo (0–1)|| –|| Dodger Stadium || 36,374 || 2–0 || W2
|- style="background-color:#bfb;"
| 3 || April 4 || @ Dodgers || 3–0 || Jensen (1–0) || Perez (0–1) || Nen (1) || Dodger Stadium || 32,064 || 3–0 || W3
|- style="background-color:#bfb;"
| 4 || April 5 || Padres || 3–1 (10) || Worrell (1–0) || Reed (0-1) || || Pacific Bell Park || 41,714 || 4–0 || W4
|- style="background-color:#bfb;"
| 5 || April 6 || Padres || 4–1 || Fultz (1–0) || Jarvis (0–2) || Nen (2) || Pacific Bell Park || 40,894 || 5–0 || W5
|- style="background-color:#bfb;"
| 6 || April 7 || Padres || 10–1 || Hernández (2–0) || Tollberg (0–2) || || Pacific Bell Park || 40,819 || 6–0 || W6
|- style="background-color:#fbb;"
| 7 || April 9 || Dodgers || 0–3 || Nomo (1–1)|| Ortiz (1–1) || Gagne (2)|| Pacific Bell Park || 40,706 || 6–1 || L1
|- style="background-color:#bfb;"
| 8 || April 10 || Dodgers || 2–1 || Nen (1–0) || Quantrill (0–1) || –|| Pacific Bell Park || 40,762 || 7–1 || W1
|- style="background-color:#fbb;"
| 9 || April 11 || Dodgers || 3–4 ||  Daal (1–0) || Rueter (0–1) || Gagne (3) || Pacific Bell Park || 40,934 || 7–2 || L1
|- style="background-color:#bfb;"
| 10 || April 12 || Brewers || 5–1 || Ainsworth (1–0) || Sheets (1–2)|| || Pacific Bell Park || 37,483 || 8–2 || W1
|- style="background-color:#bfb;"
| 11 || April 13 || Brewers || 3–2 || Hernández (3–0) || Figueroa (0-1) || Nen (3) || Pacific Bell Park || 41,206 || 9–2 || W2
|- style="background-color:#fbb;"
| 12 || April 14 || Brewers || 3–4 ||  Vizcaino (1-1)|| Rodríguez (0–1) || || Pacific Bell Park || 40,936 || 9–3 || L1
|- style="background-color:#fbb;"
| 13 || April 15 || @ Padres || 3–4 ||Embree (2-0) || Christiansen (0–1) || || Qualcomm Stadium || 14,675 || 9–4 || L2
|- style="background-color:#bfb;"
| 14 || April 16 || @ Padres || 5–1 || Rueter (1–1) || Tomko (0-1) || || Qualcomm Stadium || 20,930 || 10–4 || W1
|- style="background-color:#fbb;"
| 15 || April 17 || @ Padres || 3–5 ||  Jarvis (1-3) || Ainsworth (1–1) || Hoffman (6)|| Qualcomm Stadium || 22,438 || 10–5 || L1
|- style="background-color:#bfb;"
| 16 || April 19 || @ Astros || 3–2 || Hernández (4–0) || Reynolds (2–2)|| Nen (4) || Astros Field || 32,028 || 11–5 || W1
|- style="background-color:#bfb;"
| 17 || April 20 || @ Astros || 13–9 || Ortiz (2–1) || Redding (0-1)|| Nen (5) || Astros Field || 35,969 || 12–5 || W2
|- style="background-color:#fbb;"
| 18 || April 21 || @ Astros || 0–4 || Mlicki (2–2) || Jensen (1–1) || || Astros Field || 32,305 || 12–6 || L1
|- style="background-color:#bfb;"
| 19 || April 23 || @ Cubs || 12–4 || Rueter (2–1) ||Bere (1–2)|| || Wrigley Field || 30,643 || 13–6 || W1
|- style="background-color:#fbb;"
| 20 || April 24 || @ Cubs || 4–10 || Borowski (1-0)|| Fultz (1–1) || || Wrigley Field || 28,817 || 13–7 || L1
|- style="background-color:#fbb;"
| 21 || April 25 || @ Cubs || 1–2 || Lieber (3-0) || Hernández (4–1) || Alfonseca (4)|| Wrigley Field || 33,138 || 13–8 || L2
|- style="background-color:#fbb;"
| 22 || April 26 || @ Reds || 3–4 || Sullivan (3-0)|| Rodríguez (0–2) || Graves (9)|| Cinergy Field || 28,341 || 13–9 || L3
|- style="background-color:#fbb;"
| 23 || April 27 || @ Reds || 4–8 (8) || Rijo (2-0)|| Jensen (1–2) || || Cinergy Field || 22,616 || 13–10 || L4
|- style="background-color:#bfb;"
| 24 || April 28 || @ Reds || 5–4 || Rueter (3–1) || Haynes (2-3)|| Nen (6) || Cinergy Field || 23,426 || 14–10 || W1
|- style="background-color:#bfb;"
| 25 || April 29 || Phillies || 8–5 || Worrell (2–0) ||Cormier (1-3) || Nen (7) || Pacific Bell Park || 35,136 || 15–10 || W2
|- style="background-color:#fbb;"
| 26 || April 30 || Phillies || 2–8 || Padilla (3–2)|| Hernández (4–2) || || Pacific Bell Park || 34,918 || 15–11 || L1
|-

|- style="background-color:#bfb;"
| 27 || May 1 || Phillies || 2–1 || Rodríguez (1–2) || Bottalico (0–2) || Nen (8) || Pacific Bell Park || 36,304 || 16–11 || W1
|- style="background-color:#bfb;"
| 28 || May 3 || Reds || 6–1 || Rueter (4–1) || Rijo (2–1) || || Pacific Bell Park || 39,845 || 17–11 || W2
|- style="background-color:#bfb;"
| 29 || May 4 || Reds || 3–0 || Jensen (2–2) || Haynes (2–4)|| Nen (9) || Pacific Bell Park || 40,959 || 18–11 || W3
|- style="background-color:#bfb;"
| 30 || May 5 || Reds || 6–5 (10) || Nen (2–0) || Pineda (0–3)|| || Pacific Bell Park || 41,263 || 19–11 || W4
|- style="background-color:#bfb;"
| 31 || May 7 || @ Mets || 5–1 || Ortiz (3–1) || Trachsel (2–4)|| || Shea Stadium || 40,016 || 20–11 || W5
|- style="background-color:#bfb;"
| 32 || May 8 || @ Mets || 8–2 || Rueter (5–1) || Estes (1–4)|| || Shea Stadium || 29,267 || 21–11 || W6
|- style="background-color:#bfb;"
| 33 || May 9 || @ Mets || 4–3 || Jensen (3–2) || Astacio (5–2)|| Nen (10) || Shea Stadium || 28,757 || 22–11 || W7
|- style="background-color:#fbb;"
| 34 || May 10 || @ Expos || 3–6 || Vázquez (2–2)|| Hernández (4–3) || || Olympic Stadium || 7,238 || 22–12 || L1
|- style="background-color:#bfb;"
| 35 || May 11 || @ Expos || 3–2 || Fultz (2–1) || Reames (0–1)|| Nen (11) || Olympic Stadium || 29,778 || 23–12 || W1
|- style="background-color:#fbb;"
| 36 || May 12 || @ Expos || 2–4 || Armas Jr (5–3)|| Ortiz (3–2) || Herges (6)|| Olympic Stadium || 5,528 || 23–13 || L1
|- style="background-color:#bfb;"
| 37 || May 13 || Braves || 7–6 (11) || Worrell (3–0) || Hammond (1–2)|| || Pacific Bell Park || 36,331 || 24–13 || W1
|- style="background-color:#bfb;"
| 38 || May 14 || Braves || 2–0 || Jensen (4–2) || Moss (1–1)|| Nen (12) || Pacific Bell Park || 36,972 || 25–13 || W2
|- style="background-color:#fbb;"
| 39 || May 15 || Braves || 1–6 ||Maddux (4–2)|| Hernández (4–4) || || Pacific Bell Park || 38,164 || 25–14 || L1
|- style="background-color:#fbb;"
| 40 || May 16 || Braves || 4–5 || Marquis (3–2)|| Schmidt (0–1) || || Pacific Bell Park || 40,236 || 25–15 || L2
|- style="background-color:#bfb;"
| 41 || May 17 || Marlins || 9–3 || Ortiz (4–2) ||Dempster (2–4) || Nen (13) || Pacific Bell Park || 37,977 || 26–15 || W1
|- style="background-color:#bfb;"
| 42 || May 18 || Marlins || 10–5 || Rueter (6–1) ||Penny (3–3) || Nen (14) || Pacific Bell Park || 40,922 || 27–15 || W2
|- style="background-color:#fbb;"
| 43 || May 19 || Marlins || 2–4 || Beckett (2–2)|| Jensen (4–3) || Núñez (9)|| Pacific Bell Park || 40,805 || 27–16 || L1
|- style="background-color:#fbb;"
| 44 || May 21 || @ Diamondbacks || 4–9 || Johnson (8–1)|| Fultz (2–2) || || Bank One Ballpark || 47,602 || 27–17 || L2
|- style="background-color:#bfb;"
| 45 || May 22 || @ Diamondbacks || 12–5 || Zerbe (1–0) || Morgan (1–1)|| || Bank One Ballpark || 40,351 || 28–17 || W1
|- style="background-color:#fbb;"
| 46 || May 24 || @ Rockies || 5–8 || Stark (3–0)|| Ortiz (4–3) || Jiménez (12)|| Coors Field || 37,627 || 28–18 || L1
|- style="background-color:#fbb;"
| 47 || May 25 || @ Rockies || 3–6 || Nichting (1–1)|| Rueter (6–2) || || Coors Field || 41,957 || 28–19 || L2
|- style="background-color:#fbb;"
| 48 || May 26 || @ Rockies || 6–10 || Jennings (5–2)|| Jensen (4–4) || || Coors Field || 48,073 || 28–20 || L3
|- style="background-color:#bfb;"
| 49 || May 27 || Diamondbacks || 7–3 || Hernández (5–4) || Anderson (0–4)|| || Pacific Bell Park || 42,005 || 29–20 || W1
|- style="background-color:#bfb;"
| 50 || May 28 || Diamondbacks || 1–0 (10) || Nen (3–0) || Myers (3–2)|| || Pacific Bell Park || 38,390 || 30–20 || W2
|- style="background-color:#fbb;"
| 51 || May 29 || Diamondbacks || 3–7 || Schilling (10–1)|| Ortiz (4–4) || || Pacific Bell Park || 40,198 || 30–21 || L1
|- style="background-color:#fbb;"
| 52 || May 30 || Diamondbacks || 0–1 || Helling (5–5)|| Rueter (6–3) || Kim (13)|| Pacific Bell Park || 41,156 || 30–22 || L2
|- style="background-color:#fbb;"
| 53 || May 31 || Rockies || 2–6 || Jennings (6–2)|| Jensen (4–5) ||Jones (1) || Pacific Bell Park || 38,337 || 30–23 || L3
|-

|- style="background-color:#fbb;"
| 54 || June 1 || Rockies || 4–5 || Hampton (3–6)|| Hernández (5–5) || Jiménez (15)|| Pacific Bell Park || 40,893 || 30–24 || L4
|- style="background-color:#bfb;"
| 55 || June 2 || Rockies || 9–2 || Schmidt (1–1) || Thomson (6–4)|| || Pacific Bell Park || 40,651 || 31–24 || W1
|- style="background-color:#bfb;"
| 56 || June 3 || @ Padres || 11–3 || Ortiz (5–4) ||  Middlebrook (1–2) || || Qualcomm Stadium || 16,534 || 32–24 || W2
|- style="background-color:#bfb;"
| 57 || June 4 || @ Padres || 3–1 || Rueter (7–3) || Jones (3-4) || Nen (15) || Qualcomm Stadium || 23,567 || 33–24 || W3
|- style="background-color:#bfb;"
| 58 || June 5 || @ Padres || 12–2 || Jensen (5–5) || Tankersley (1–2) || || Qualcomm Stadium || 21,498 || 34–24 || W4
|- style="background-color:#fbb;"
| 59 || June 7 || @ Yankees || 1–2 || Mussina (9–2)|| Hernández (5–6) ||  Rivera (18)|| Yankee Stadium || 55,053 || 34–25 || L1
|- style="background-color:#bfb;"
| 60 || June 8 || @ Yankees || 4–3 || Schmidt (2–1) || Rivera (1–3)|| Nen (16) || Yankee Stadium || 55,194 || 35–25 || W1
|- style="background-color:#fbb;"
| 61 || June 9 || @ Yankees || 2–4 ||Clemens (8–2) || Rodríguez (1–3) || || Yankee Stadium || 55,335 || 35–26 || L1
|- style="background-color:#fbb;"
| 62 || June 10 || @ Blue Jays || 5–6 || Thurman (1–1)  || Rueter (7–4) || Escobar (13)|| SkyDome || 18,081 || 35–27 || L2
|- style="background-color:#bfb;"
| 63 || June 11 || @ Blue Jays || 9–2 || Jensen (6–5) || Lyon (1–4)|| || SkyDome || 20,228 || 36–27 || W1
|- style="background-color:#bfb;"
| 64 || June 12 || @ Blue Jays || 6–3 || Hernández (6–6) || Halladay (7–3)|| Nen (17) || SkyDome || 21,106 || 37–27 || W2
|- style="background-color:#fbb;"
| 65 || June 14 || Athletics || 2–3 || Hudson (4–6)|| Schmidt (2–2) || Koch (14)|| Pacific Bell Park || 41,457 || 37–28 || L1
|- style="background-color:#bfb;"
| 66 || June 15 || Athletics || 6–2 || Zerbe (2–0) ||Harang (2–2) || || Pacific Bell Park || 41,298 || 38–28 || W1
|- style="background-color:#fbb;"
| 67 || June 16 || Athletics || 1–2 ||Zito (9–2)|| Rueter (7–5) || Koch (15)|| Pacific Bell Park || 41,550 || 38–29 || L1
|- style="background-color:#fbb;"
| 68 || June 18 || Devil Rays || 3–8 || Kennedy (5–5) || Hernández (6–7) || || Pacific Bell Park || 36,869 || 38–30 || L2
|- style="background-color:#bfb;"
| 69 || June 19 || Devil Rays || 8–0 || Schmidt (3–2) || Rupe (5–9)|| || Pacific Bell Park || 35,909 || 39–30 || W1
|- style="background-color:#bfb;"
| 70 || June 20 || Devil Rays || 10–2 || Ortiz (6–4) || Sturtze (0–8)|| || Pacific Bell Park || 39,101 || 40–30 || W2
|- style="background-color:#bfb;"
| 71 || June 21 || Orioles || 4–3 || Rodríguez (2–3) || Bauer (3–3)|| Nen (18) || Pacific Bell Park || 40,634 || 41–30 || W3
|- style="background-color:#fbb;"
| 72 || June 22 || Orioles || 2–4 ||Driskill (5–0) || Jensen (6–6) || Julio (14)|| Pacific Bell Park || 41,269 || 41–31 || L1
|- style="background-color:#fbb;"
| 73 || June 23 || Orioles || 1–3 || Johnson (2–5) || Hernández (6–8) || Julio (15)|| Pacific Bell Park || 41,980 || 41–32 || L2
|- style="background-color:#bfb;"
| 74 || June 24 || @ Padres || 7–6 || Worrell (4–0) || Hoffman (1-1) || Nen (19) || Qualcomm Stadium || 17,475 || 42–32 || W1
|- style="background-color:#fbb;"
| 75 || June 25 || @ Padres || 7–10 || Myers (1-0) || Rodríguez (2–4) || Hoffman (20) || Qualcomm Stadium || 15,856 || 42–33 || L1
|- style="background-color:#bfb;"
| 76 || June 26 || Padres || 6–5 (12) || Witasick (1–0) || Myers (1-1) || || Pacific Bell Park || 40,037 || 43–33 || W1
|- style="background-color:#bfb;"
| 77 || June 27 || Padres || 11–6 || Jensen (7–6) || Middlebrook (1-3) || Nen (20) || Pacific Bell Park || 39,519 || 44–33 || W2
|- style="background-color:#fbb;"
| 78 || June 28 || @ Athletics || 6–10 || Mulder (9–4)|| Hernández (6–9) || || Network Associates Coliseum || 46,345 || 44–34 || L1
|- style="background-color:#bfb;"
| 79 || June 29 || @ Athletics || 5–3 || Schmidt (4–2) || Lidle (2–7)|| Nen (21) || Network Associates Coliseum || 53,501 || 45–34 || W1
|- style="background-color:#fbb;"
| 80 || June 30 || @ Athletics || 0–7 || Hudson (6-7)|| Ortiz (6–5) || || Network Associates Coliseum || 54,123 || 45–35 || L1
|-

|- style="background-color:#bfb;"
| 81 || July 1 || @ Rockies || 8–6 || Rodríguez (3–4) || Jiménez (2–5)|| Nen (22) || Coors Field || 31,115 || 46–35 || W1
|- style="background-color:#bfb;"
| 82 || July 2 || @ Rockies || 18–5 || Jensen (8–6) || Neagle (4–6)|| || Coors Field || 30,838 || 47–35 || W2
|- style="background-color:#fbb;"
| 83 || July 3 || @ Rockies || 4–14 || Jennings (9–4) || Hernández (6–10) || || Coors Field || 48,504 || 47–36 || L1
|- style="background-color:#fbb;"
| 84 || July 4 || @ Diamondbacks || 3–6 || Anderson (4–7)|| Schmidt (4–3) ||Kim (22)|| Bank One Ballpark || 45,686 || 47–37 || L2
|- style="background-color:#fbb;"
| 85 || July 5 || @ Diamondbacks || 1–2 || Schilling (14–3)|| Ortiz (6–6) || || Bank One Ballpark || 45,211 || 47–38 || L3
|- style="background-color:#bfb;"
| 86 || July 6 || @ Diamondbacks || 3–2 || Worrell (5–0) || Mantei (1–1)|| Nen (23) || Bank One Ballpark || 47,687 || 48–38 || W1
|- style="background-color:#bfb;"
| 87 || July 7 || @ Diamondbacks || 5–2 || Jensen (9–6) || Helling (7–7) || Nen (24) || Bank One Ballpark || 41,1400 || 49–38 || W2
|- style="background-color:#bfb;"
| 88 || July 11 || Rockies || 3–2 || Worrell (6–0) || Jiménez (2–6)|| || Pacific Bell Park || 39,644 || 50–38 || W3
|- style="background-color:#bfb;"
| 89 || July 12 || Rockies || 9–0 || Hernández (7–10) || Hampton (5–10)|| || Pacific Bell Park || 40,963 || 51–38 || W4
|- style="background-color:#bfb;"
| 90 || July 13 || Rockies || 6–1 || Schmidt (5–3) || Thomson (7–8)|| || Pacific Bell Park || 41,434 || 52–38 || W5
|- style="background-color:#fbb;"
| 91 || July 14 || Rockies || 3–5 ||Chacon (4–6)|| Rueter (7–6) || || Pacific Bell Park || 41,980 || 52–39 || L1
|- style="background-color:#bfb;"
| 92 || July 15 || Diamondbacks || 6–3 || Jensen (10–6) || Helling (7–8)|| || Pacific Bell Park || 41,645 || 53–39 || W1
|- style="background-color:#fbb;"
| 93 || July 16 || Diamondbacks || 3–5 || Johnson (13-3) || Rodríguez (3–5) || Kim (26)|| Pacific Bell Park || 41,936 || 53–40 || L1
|- style="background-color:#bfb;"
| 94 || July 17 || @ Cardinals || 5–4 || Worrell (7–0) || Veres (3–5)|| Nen (25) || Busch Stadium || 44,355 || 54–40 || W1
|- style="background-color:#fbb;"
| 95 || July 18 || @ Cardinals || 1–5 || Morris (11–6)|| Schmidt (5–4) || || Busch Stadium || 44,118 || 54–41 || L1
|- style="background-color:#bfb;"
| 96 || July 19 || @ Dodgers || 3–2 (12) || Nen (4–0) || Mota (1–1) || –|| Dodger Stadium || 53,033 || 55–41 || W1
|- style="background-color:#fbb;"
| 97 || July 20 || @ Dodgers || 2–4 || Quantrill (2–3) || Rodríguez (3–6) || Gagne (34) || Dodger Stadium || 50,093 || 55–42 || L1
|- style="background-color:#bfb;"
| 98 || July 21 || @ Dodgers || 6–4 || Ortiz (7–6) ||Carrara (5-3) || Nen (26) || Dodger Stadium || 54,344 || 56–42 || W1
|- style="background-color:#fbb;"
| 99 || July 22 || Cardinals || 3–5 || Hackman (3–3)|| Worrell (7–1) || Isringhausen (23)|| Pacific Bell Park || 40,607 || 56–43 || L1
|- style="background-color:#fbb;"
| 100 || July 23 || Cardinals || 0–4 || Morris (12–6)|| Schmidt (5–5) || || Pacific Bell Park || 40,453 || 56–44 || L2
|- style="background-color:#bfb;"
| 101 || July 24 || Cardinals || 6–4 || Rueter (8–6) || Benes (0-3)|| Nen (27) || Pacific Bell Park || 41,005 || 57–44 || W1
|- style="background-color:#fbb;"
| 102 || July 25 || Cardinals || 3–4 || Smith (4–1)|| Jensen (10–7) || Isringhausen (24)|| Pacific Bell Park || 41,503 || 57–45 || L1
|- style="background-color:#fbb;"
| 103 || July 26 || Dodgers || 6–11 || Nomo (10–6) || Ortiz (7–7) ||– || Pacific Bell Park || 41,675 || 57–46 || L2
|- style="background-color:#fbb;"
| 104 || July 27 || Dodgers || 1–5 || Daal (8–5)|| Hernández (7–11) ||– || Pacific Bell Park || 41,814 || 57–47 || L3
|- style="background-color:#bfb;"
| 105 || July 28 || Dodgers || 3–1 || Schmidt (6–5) || Ashby (7-9) || Nen (28) || Pacific Bell Park || 41,642 || 58–47 || W1
|- style="background-color:#bfb;"
| 106 || July 30 || @ Phillies || 10–3 || Rueter (9–6) || Myers (1–1)|| || Veterans Stadium || 27,330 || 59–47 || W2
|- style="background-color:#fbb;"
| 107 || July 31 || @ Phillies || 6–8 || Timlin (2–3)|| Brohawn (0–1) || Mesa (29)|| Veterans Stadium || 22,595 || 59–48 || L1
|-

|- style="background-color:#fbb;"
| 108 || August 1 || @ Phillies || 1–2 || Wolf (7–7)|| Ortiz (7–8) ||Mesa (30) || Veterans Stadium || 20,380 || 59–49 || L2
|- style="background-color:#fbb;"
| 109 || August 2 || @ Pirates || 5–6 || Boehringer (4–3)|| Nen (4–1) || || PNC Park || 28,203 || 59–50 || L3
|- style="background-color:#bfb;"
| 110 || August 3 || @ Pirates || 11–6 || Schmidt (7–5) || Wells (10–9)|| || PNC Park || 38,275 || 60–50 || W1
|- style="background-color:#bfb;"
| 111 || August 4 || @ Pirates || 10–5 || Rueter (10–6) || Benson (4–6)|| || PNC Park || 31,398 || 61–50 || W2
|- style="background-color:#bfb;"
| 112 || August 6 || Cubs || 11–10 || Worrell (8–1) || Farnsworth (3–4)|| Nen (29) || Pacific Bell Park || 41,991 || 62–50 || W3
|- style="background-color:#bfb;"
| 113 || August 7 || Cubs || 4–3 (10) || Nen (5–1) || Alfonseca (1–3)|| || Pacific Bell Park || 41,408 || 63–50 || W4
|- style="background-color:#fbb;"
| 114 || August 8 || Cubs || 3–9 || Clement (9–8) || Hernández (7–12) || || Pacific Bell Park || 41,617 || 63–51 || L1
|- style="background-color:#fbb;"
| 115 || August 9 || Pirates || 3–4 || Wells (11–9)|| Schmidt (7–6) ||Williams (34)|| Pacific Bell Park || 41,897 || 63–52 || L2
|- style="background-color:#bfb;"
| 116 || August 10 || Pirates || 8–3 || Aybar (1–0) || Lincoln (0–3)|| || Pacific Bell Park || 41,146 || 64–52 || W1
|- style="background-color:#bfb;"
| 117 || August 11 || Pirates || 5–4 (11) || Nen (6–1) || Williams (1–3)|| || Pacific Bell Park || 41,479 || 65–52 || W2
|- style="background-color:#bfb;"
| 118 || August 13 || @ Braves || 7–2 || Ortiz (8–8) || Maddux (11–4)|| || Turner Field || 39,794 || 66–52 || W3
|- style="background-color:#fbb;"
| 119 || August 14 || @ Braves || 0–1 || Glavine (16–6)|| Hernández (7–13) || Smoltz (42)|| Turner Field || 31,039 || 66–53 || L1
|- style="text-align:center; style="background-color:#bbb;"
| || August 15 || @ Braves || 3–3 (10) || || || || Turner Field || 35,340 || 66–53 || T1
|- style="background-color:#fbb;"
| 120 || August 16 || @ Marlins || 2–4 || Tejera (8–5) || Rueter (10–7) || Looper (6) || Pro Player Stadium || 14,724 || 66–54 || L1
|- style="background-color:#fbb;"
| 121 || August 17 || @ Marlins || 3–7 || Beckett (5–6) || Jensen (10–8) || || Pro Player Stadium || 20,926 || 66–55 || L2
|- style="background-color:#fbb;"
| 122 || August 18 || @ Marlins || 0–3 || Burnett (12–9) || Ortiz (8–9) || || Pro Player Stadium || 11,158 || 66–56 || L3
|- style="background-color:#bfb;"
| 123 || August 19 || @ Marlins || 3–0 || Hernández (8–13) || Tavarez (8–10)|| || Pro Player Stadium || 7,100 || 67–56 || W1
|- style="background-color:#bfb;"
| 124 || August 20 || Mets || 1–0 || Schmidt (8–6) || Leiter (10–10)|| || Pacific Bell Park || 41,283 || 68–56 || W2
|- style="background-color:#bfb;"
| 125 || August 21 || Mets || 3–1 || Rueter (11–7) || Thomson (7–11)|| Nen (30) || Pacific Bell Park || 41,021 || 69–56 || W3
|- style="background-color:#bfb;"
| 126 || August 22 || Mets || 3–1 || Jensen (11–8) || Bacsik (2–1) || Nen (31) || Pacific Bell Park || 41,207 || 70–56 || W4
|- style="background-color:#fbb;"
| 127 || August 23 || Expos || 2–7 || Ohka (11–6) || Ortiz (8–10) || Eischen (1)|| Pacific Bell Park || 40,879 || 70–57 || L1
|- style="background-color:#fbb;"
| 128 || August 24 || Expos || 2–7 || Colon (17–6) || Hernández (8–14) || Stewart (17) || Pacific Bell Park || 41,165 || 70–58 || L2
|- style="background-color:#bfb;"
| 129 || August 25 || Expos || 8–4 || Schmidt (9–6) || Vazquez (8–11)|| || Pacific Bell Park || 41,408 || 71–58 || W1
|- style="background-color:#bfb;"
| 130 || August 26 || @ Rockies || 4–3 || Rodríguez (4–6) || Jones (1–3)|| Nen (32) || Coors Field || 26,877 || 72–58 || W2
|- style="background-color:#bfb;"
| 131 || August 27 || @ Rockies || 7–4 || Rodríguez (5–6) || Jones (1–4) || Nen (33) || Coors Field || 26,592 || 73–58 || W3
|- style="background-color:#bfb;"
| 132 || August 28 || @ Rockies || 9–1 || Ortiz (9–10) || Jennings (15-6)|| || Coors Field || 27,080 || 74–58 || W4
|- style="background-color:#bfb;"
| 133 || August 29 || @ Rockies || 10–6 || Hernández (9–14) || Hampton (7-14)|| || Coors Field || 26,330 || 75–58 || W5
|- style="background-color:#bfb;"
| 134 || August 30 || @ Diamondbacks || 7–6 || Schmidt (10–6) || Johnson (19-5)|| Nen (34) || Bank One Ballpark || 47,366 || 76–58 || W6
|- style="background-color:#bfb;"
| 135 || August 31 || @ Diamondbacks || 5–0 || Rueter (12–7) || Schilling (21-5)|| || Bank One Ballpark || 41,915 || 77–58 || W7
|-

|- style="background-color:#fbb;"
| 136 || September 1 || @ Diamondbacks || 6–7 || Kim (8–2) || Nen (6–2) || || Bank One Ballpark || 41,707 || 77–59 || L1
|- style="background-color:#bfb;"
| 137 || September 3 || Rockies || 4–2 || Ortiz (10–10) || Hampton (7–15)|| Nen (35) || Pacific Bell Park || 33,483 || 78–59 || W1
|- style="background-color:#fbb;"
| 138 || September 4 || Rockies || 1–2 || Neagle (8–9)|| Hernández (9–15) || Jiménez (36) || Pacific Bell Park || 34,342 || 78–60 || L1
|- style="background-color:#fbb;"
| 139 || September 5 || Diamondbacks || 5–8 || Schilling (22–5)|| Schmidt (10–7) || || Pacific Bell Park || 37,995 || 78–61 || L2
|- style="background-color:#bfb;"
| 140 || September 6 || Diamondbacks || 1–0 || Rodríguez (6–6) || Fetters (3–1)|| || Pacific Bell Park || 40,782 || 79–61 || W1
|- style="background-color:#bfb;"
| 141 || September 7 || Diamondbacks || 4–3 || Rodríguez (7–6) || Kim (8–3)|| || Pacific Bell Park || 41,016 || 80–61 || W2
|- style="background-color:#bfb;"
| 142 || September 8 || Diamondbacks || 3–1 || Ortiz (11–10) || Anderson (6–11)|| Nen (36) || Pacific Bell Park || 41,100 || 81–61 || W3
|- style="background-color:#bfb;"
| 143 || September 9 || Dodgers || 6–5 || Hernández (10–15) || Perez (13–9) || Nen (37) || Pacific Bell Park || 40,740 || 82–61 || W4
|- style="background-color:#bfb;"
| 144 || September 10 || Dodgers || 5–2 || Schmidt (11–7) || Brown (3–4) || Nen (38) || Pacific Bell Park || 41,325 || 83–61 || W5
|- style="background-color:#fbb;"
| 145 || September 11 || Dodgers || 3–7 || Nomo (14–6) || Rueter (12–8) || –|| Pacific Bell Park || 41,310 || 83–62 || L1
|- style="background-color:#fbb;"
| 146 || September 12 || @ Padres || 2–3 (10) || Hoffman (2–4)|| Worrell (8–2) || || Qualcomm Stadium || 16,143 || 83–63 || L2
|- style="background-color:#bfb;"
| 147 || September 13 || @ Padres || 10–3 || Ortiz (12–10) || Lawrence (12–11)|| || Qualcomm Stadium || 25,857 || 84–63 || W1
|- style="background-color:#bfb;"
| 148 || September 14 || Padres || 12–4 || Hernández (11–15) ||  Tomko (9–10)|| || Pacific Bell Park || 41,506 || 85–63 || W2
|- style="background-color:#fbb;"
| 149 || September 15 || Padres || 1–4 || Peavy (6–7)|| Ainsworth (1–2) || Hoffman (37) || Pacific Bell Park || 41,116 || 85–64 || L1
|- style="background-color:#fbb;"
| 150 || September 16 || @ Dodgers || 6–7 || Nomo (15–6)|| Schmidt (11–8) || Gagne (49)|| Dodger Stadium || 35,767 || 85–65 || L2
|- style="background-color:#bfb;"
| 151 || September 17 || @ Dodgers || 6–4 || Rueter (13–8) || Daal (11–9) || Nen (39)|| Dodger Stadium || 40,161 || 86–65 || W1
|- style="background-color:#bfb;"
| 152 || September 18 || @ Dodgers || 7–4 || Ortiz (13–10) || Ellis (0–1) || – || Dodger Stadium || 40,164 || 87–65 || W2
|- style="background-color:#fbb;"
| 153 || September 19 || @ Dodgers || 3–6 || Perez (15–9) || Hernández (11–16) || –|| Dodger Stadium || 43,921 || 87–66 || L1
|- style="background-color:#bfb;"
| 154 || September 20 || @ Brewers || 5–1 || Jensen (12–8) ||Neugebauer (1–7) || || Miller Park || 29,271 || 88–66 || W1
|- style="background-color:#bfb;"
| 155 || September 21 || @ Brewers || 3–1 || Schmidt (12–8) || Diggins (0–3)|| Nen (40) || Miller Park || 28,119 || 89–66 || W2
|- style="background-color:#bfb;"
| 156 || September 22 || @ Brewers || 3–1 || Rodríguez (8–6) || Vizcaino (5–2)|| Nen (41) || Miller Park || 34,856 || 90–66 || W3
|- style="background-color:#bfb;"
| 157 || September 24 || Padres || 12–3 || Ortiz (14–10) || Perez (3–5)|| || Pacific Bell Park || 37,772 || 91–66 || W4
|- style="background-color:#bfb;"
| 158 || September 25 || Padres || 6–0 || Hernández (12–16) || Condrey (1–2)|| || Pacific Bell Park || 38,001 || 92–66 || W5
|- style="background-color:#bfb;"
| 159 || September 27 || Astros || 2–1 || Schmidt (13–8) || Miller (15–4)|| Nen (42) || Pacific Bell Park || 41,385 || 93–66 || W6
|- style="background-color:#bfb;"
| 160 || September 28 || Astros || 5–2 || Rueter (14–8) || Robertson (0–2)|| Nen (43) || Pacific Bell Park || 41,045 || 94–66 || W7
|- style="background-color:#bfb;"
| 161 || September 29 || Astros || 7–0 || Jensen (13–8) || Oswalt (19–9)|| || Pacific Bell Park || 40,944 || 95–66 || W8
|-

Postseason

|-  style="text-align:center; background:#bfb;"
| 1 NLDS || October 2 || @ Braves || 8–5 || Ortiz (1–0) || Glavine (0–1) || Nen (1) || Turner Field || 41,903 || 1–0 || W1
|-  style="text-align:center; background:#fbb;"
| 2 NLDS || October 3 || @ Braves || 3–7 || Milwood (1–0) || Rueter (0–1) || || Turner Field || 47,167 || 1–1 || L1
|-  style="text-align:center; background:#fbb;"
| 3 NLDS || October 5 || Braves || 2–10 || Maddux (1–0) || Schmidt (0–1) || || Pacific Bell Park || 43,043 || 1–2 || L2
|-  style="text-align:center; background:#bfb;"
| 4 NLDS || October 6 || Braves || 8–3 || Hernández (1–0) || Glavine (0–2) || || Pacific Bell Park || 43,070 || 2–2 || W1
|-  style="text-align:center; background:#bfb;"
| 5 NLDS || October 7 || @ Braves || 3–1 || Ortiz (2–0) || Milwood (1–1) || Nen (2) || Turner Field || 45,203 || 3–2 || W2
|-

|-  style="text-align:center; background:#bfb;"
| 1 NLCS || October 9 || @ Cardinals || 9–6 || Rueter (1–0) || Morris (0–1) || Nen (1) || Busch Stadium || 52,175 || 1–0 || W1
|-  style="text-align:center; background:#bfb;"
| 2 NLCS || October 10 || @ Cardinals || 4–1 || Schmidt (1–0) || Williams (0–1) || Nen (2) || Busch Stadium || 52,195 || 2–0 || W1
|-  style="text-align:center; background:#fbb;"
| 3 NLCS || October 12 || Cardinals || 4–5 || Finley (1–0)|| Witasick (0–1) || Isringhausen (1) || Pacific Bell Park || 42,177 || 2–1 || L1
|-  style="text-align:center; background:#bfb;"
| 4 NLCS || October 13 || Cardinals || 4–3 || Worrell (1–0) || White (0–1) || Nen (3) || Pacific Bell Park || 42,676 || 3–1 || W1
|-  style="text-align:center; background:#bfb;"
| 5 NLCS || October 14 || Cardinals || 2–1 || Worrell (2–0) || Morris (0–2) || || Pacific Bell Park || 42,673 || 4–1 || W2
|-

|-  style="text-align:center; background:#bfb;"
| 1 WS || October 19 || @ Angels || 4–3 || Schmidt (1–0) || Washburn (0–1) || Nen (1) || Edison International Field of Anaheim || 44,603 || 1–0 || W1
|-  style="text-align:center; background:#fbb;"
| 2 WS || October 20 || @ Angels || 10–11 || Rodríguez (1–0) || Rodríguez (0–1) || Percival (1) || Edison International Field of Anaheim || 44,584 || 1–1 || L1
|-  style="text-align:center; background:#fbb;"
| 3 WS || October 22 || Angels || 4–10 || Ortiz (1–0) || Hernández (0–1) || || Pacific Bell Park || 42,707 || 1–2 || L2
|-  style="text-align:center; background:#bfb;"
| 4 WS || October 23 || Angels || 4–3 || Worrell (1–0) || Rodríguez (1–1) || Nen (2) || Pacific Bell Park || 42,703 || 2–2 || W1
|-  style="text-align:center; background:#bfb;"
| 5 WS || October 24 || Angels || 16–4 || Schmidt (2–0) || Washburn (0–2) || || Pacific Bell Park || 42,713 || 3–2 || W2
|-  style="text-align:center; background:#fbb;"
| 6 WS || October 26 || @ Angels || 5–6 || Donnelly (1–0) || Worrell (1–1) || Percival (2) || Edison International Field of Anaheim || 44,506 || 3–3 || L1
|-  style="text-align:center; background:#fbb;"
| 7 WS || October 27 || @ Angels || 1–4 || Lackey (1–0) || Hernández (0–2) || Percival (3) || Edison International Field of Anaheim || 44,598 || 3–4 || L2
|-

Roster

Player stats

Batting

Starters by position
Note: Pos = Position; G = Games played; AB = At bats; H = Hits; Avg. = Batting average; HR = Home runs; RBI = Runs batted in

Other batters
Note: G = Games played; AB = At bats; H = Hits; Avg. = Batting average; HR = Home runs; RBI = Runs batted in

Pitching

Starting pitchers
Note: G = Games pitched; IP = Innings pitched; W = Wins; L = Losses; ERA = Earned run average; SO = Strikeouts

Other pitchers
Note: G = Games pitched; IP = Innings pitched; W = Wins; L = Losses; ERA = Earned run average; SO = Strikeouts

Relief pitchers
Note: G = Games pitched; W = Wins; L = Losses; SV = Saves; ERA = Earned run average; SO = Strikeouts

National League Divisional Playoffs

San Francisco Giants vs. Atlanta Braves
San Francisco wins the series, 3-2

National League Championship Series

Game 1
October 9: Busch Stadium, St. Louis, Missouri

Game 2
October 10: Busch Stadium, St. Louis, Missouri

Game 3
October 12: Pac Bell Park, San Francisco

Game 4
October 13: Pac Bell Park, San Francisco

Game 5
October 14: Pac Bell Park, San Francisco

World Series

Game 1
October 19, 2002 at Edison International Field of Anaheim in Anaheim, California

San Francisco won 4-3 at Edison International Field of Anaheim (now Angel Stadium of Anaheim) to take a 1-0 lead. Barry Bonds hit a home run in his first career World Series at-bat. He was one of three Giants to homer in the game (the other two were Reggie Sanders and JT Snow). Troy Glaus hit two home runs for the Angels.

Game 2
October 20, 2002 at Edison International Field of Anaheim in Anaheim, California

Anaheim won 11-10 at home in a game where the lead kept fluctuating between the two teams, tying up the series. Bonds again hit a mammoth homer with two outs in the 9th inning, off of Troy Percival. The biggest home run of the night, however, was hit by Tim Salmon, a longtime Angel, with two outs and one on in the bottom of the 8th. The dramatic blast broke a 9-9 tie and ultimately won the game for the Angels.

Game 3
October 22, 2002 at Pacific Bell Park in San Francisco

Anaheim won 10-4 in the first game at Pacific Bell Park (now Oracle Park). The Angels batted around twice without a home run in either of their 4-run innings. Barry Bonds hit another home run, becoming the
first man to homer in his first three World Series games.

Game 4
October 23, 2002 at Pacific Bell Park in San Francisco

San Francisco scored a 4-3 victory to tie the series. NLCS MVP Benito Santiago tied the game with a single in the 5th inning after the Angels walked Barry Bonds with a runner on second and two outs. David Bell put the Giants ahead with an RBI single in the bottom of the 8th. The run was unearned due to Anaheim catcher Bengie Molina's passed ball during the previous at-bat, allowing J. T. Snow to move to second.

Game 5
October 24, 2002 at Pacific Bell Park in San Francisco

San Francisco took a 16-4 blowout win in a game in which the Angels never led. The most well-known moment in this game occurred when Giants first baseman J. T. Snow scored off a Kenny Lofton triple.  3-year-old batboy Darren Baker, son of Giants manager Dusty Baker, ran to home plate to collect Lofton's bat before the play was completed and was quickly lifted by the jacket by Snow as he crossed the plate, with David Bell close on his heels. Had Snow not acted quickly, Darren could have been seriously injured.

Game 6
October 26, 2002 at Edison International Field of Anaheim in Anaheim, California

The turning point in the series came in Game 6. Leading 5-0 with one out in the bottom of the 7th inning, eight outs away from the Giants' first World Series title in San Francisco, Giants manager Dusty Baker pulled starting pitcher Russ Ortiz for setup man Félix Rodríguez after Ortiz gave up consecutive singles to third baseman Troy Glaus and designated hitter Brad Fullmer.  In a widely publicized move, Baker gave Ortiz the game ball as he sent him back to the dugout. During the pitching change the Rally Monkey came on the JumboTron, sending 45,037 Angels fans into a frenzy. Angel first baseman Scott Spiezio came to the plate and fouled off pitch after pitch before finally hitting a three-run home run that barely cleared the wall in right field.  The rally continued in the 8th inning, as Angel center fielder Darin Erstad hit a leadoff line-drive home run, followed by consecutive singles by Tim Salmon and Garret Anderson (Chone Figgins pinch ran for Salmon). When Bonds misplayed Anderson's shallow left field bloop single, Figgins and Anderson took third and second respectively.  With no outs, two runners in scoring position and now only a 5-4 lead, Baker brought in closer Robb Nen to pitch to Glaus, hoping that Nen could induce a strikeout that might yet preserve the Giants' slim lead.  However, Glaus slugged a double to the left-center field gap over Bonds' head to drive in the tying and winning runs. In the 9th inning, Angels closer Troy Percival struck out Rich Aurilia to preserve the 6-5 victory in front of the jubilant home crowd.

Game 7
October 27, 2002 at Edison International Field of Anaheim in Anaheim, California

Game 7 proved to be somewhat anticlimactic after the drama of Game 6. The Giants scored the first run on a sacrifice, but the Angels responded with a run-scoring double from catcher Bengie Molina and a three-run double to right field from left fielder Garret Anderson to open a 4-1 lead. Rookie starting pitcher John Lackey maintained that lead. In the 9th inning, closer Troy Percival provided some tense moments as he opened the inning by putting two Giants on base, with only one out. But Tsuyoshi Shinjo – the first Japanese player in a World Series game – struck out swinging, and Kenny Lofton, also representing the tying run, flied out to Darin Erstad in right-center field to end the Series. The Angels won Game 7, 4-1, to claim their franchise's first and so far only World Series Championship.  John Lackey became the first rookie pitcher to win a World Series game 7 since 1909.

Awards and honors
 David Bell 3B, Willie Mac Award
 Barry Bonds, National League Most Valuable Player
 Barry Bonds, Major League record (since broken), highest on-base percentage in one season (.582)
 Benito Santiago, 2002 NLCS MVP

All-Star Game (played July 9, 2002)
 Barry Bonds
 Benito Santiago
 Rob Nen

Farm system

References

External links
 2002 San Francisco Giants team at Baseball-Reference
 2002 San Francisco Giants team at Baseball Almanac

San Francisco Giants seasons
San Francisco Giants season
National League champion seasons
San Francisco Giants
San Francisco Giants